Francesco "Frank" Caprio (born November 24, 1936) is an American jurist and politician who served as the chief municipal judge in Providence, Rhode Island, and chairman of the Rhode Island Board of Governors for Higher Education. His judicial work is televised on the program Caught in Providence. He also has made appearances in the series Parking Wars, adjudicating several cases of traffic violations.

In 2017, videos showing his courtroom went viral, with more than 15 million views. In 2022, views of Caught in Providence neared 500 million and one video shared on Pulptastic had 43.6 million views on YouTube.

Early life and education
Caprio was born in the Italian American neighborhood of Federal Hill, Providence, the second of the three sons of Antonio Caprio, an immigrant from Teano, Italy, and Filomena Caprio, an Italian American mother from Providence whose family had immigrated from Naples, Italy. His father worked as a fruit peddler and milkman.

Caprio attended the Providence public schools while working as a dishwasher and shoe-shiner. He graduated from Central High School, where he won the state title in wrestling in 1953. He earned a bachelor's degree from Providence College. After graduating, he began teaching American government at Hope High School in Providence. While teaching at Hope, Caprio attended night school at the Suffolk University School of Law in Boston. This led to him joining the legal profession. Caprio also served in the National Guard from 1954 to 1962 in the 876th Combat Engineer Battalion. During his time in the National Guard, he was stationed at Camp Varnum in Narragansett and Fort Indiantown Gap in Pennsylvania.

Career
Caprio was elected to the Providence City Council in 1962 and served until 1968. He was elected as a delegate to the Rhode Island Constitutional Convention in 1975 and has been elected as a delegate to five Democratic National Conventions. He chaired the Rhode Island Board of Governors for Higher Education, which controls major decisions for the University of Rhode Island, Rhode Island College and Community College of Rhode Island. Since 1985, he has served as a Providence Municipal Court Judge. Parts of the proceedings over which he presided, featuring low-level citations, ran for more than two decades on local television. Caprio's TV series, Caught in Providence, originated on PEG access television in Rhode Island and was first picked up by ABC station WLNE-TV in 2000, initially airing late on Saturday nights. After a hiatus, Caught in Providence returned in 2015 and aired after the 11 o'clock newscasts on Saturdays until September 2017. Clips from this show went viral in the 2010s. The program has also received coverage from media organizations around the world, such as NBC News. On September 24, 2018, Caught in Providence went into national syndication. The show was renewed for a second season of syndication in January 2019.

Caprio is also a partner in the Coast Guard House Restaurant in Narragansett, Rhode Island.

Caprio retired in January 2023.

Community outreach 
At Suffolk University School of Law, Caprio founded the Antonio "Tup" Caprio Scholarship Fund. This scholarship, named after Caprio's father, who had only a fifth-grade education, is for Rhode Island students committed to improving access to legal services in Rhode Island urban core neighborhoods. He has also established scholarships at Providence College, Suffolk Law School, and for graduates of Central High School, named in honor of his father.

Caprio has been involved in the Boys Town of Italy, the Nickerson House Juvenile Court and Rhode Island Food Bank. In 1983 he co-chaired the Rhode Island Statue of Liberty Foundation (raising funds for the restoration of the Statue of Liberty and Ellis Island). Caprio was also a member of the Board of Regents of Elementary and Secondary education and the Governor's Pre-K thru 16 Council on education. He is a member of the President's Council at Providence College.

In 2021, Caprio started the Filomena Fund, named after his mother, which pays and supports people who are unable to pay for traffic violations. It was started in honor of a single mother from Indiana who sent a letter and a small donation to Caprio. Caprio read the letter on television and has since received similar donations from people all over the world.

Awards and honors 
Caprio was awarded an Honorary Doctorate of Law by his alma mater Suffolk University Law School in 1991 and Providence College in 2008, and also received an Honorary Doctorate of Public Service from the University of Rhode Island in 2016. In August 2018, he received the Producer's Circle Award at the Rhode Island International Film Festival.

Personal life 
Caprio has been married to Joyce E. Caprio for over 50 years. They have five children: Frank T. Caprio, David Caprio, Marissa Caprio Pesce, John Caprio, and Paul Caprio. They have seven grandchildren and two great-grandchildren. An avid Boston Red Sox fan, Caprio threw the ceremonial first pitch on July 25, 2019, at Fenway Park, when the Red Sox played the New York Yankees.

References

External links 
 Caught in Providence
 This black caped hero isn’t Batman at Hindustan Times, 2017

Living people
1936 births
Rhode Island state court judges
Providence City Council members
Suffolk University Law School alumni
Providence College alumni
Rhode Island Democrats
American people of Italian descent
Federal Hill, Providence, Rhode Island